302 is a year of the Julian calendar.

302 may also refer to:

 302 BC, a year
 302 (number), the natural number
 HTTP 302, the web page redirection "Found" or "Moved Temporarily"
 Category 302, a Singapore military medical code used for transgender people in Singapore
 FD-302, an FBI form commonly referred to as simply "302" that is used to summarize interviews
 Model 302 telephone, used by the Bell System and manufactured from 1937 to 1954

See also
 Flight 302 (disambiguation)